The Rest of the Story was a Monday-through-Friday radio program originally hosted by Paul Harvey. Beginning as a part of his newscasts during the Second World War and then premiering as its own series on the ABC Radio Networks on May 10, 1976, The Rest of the Story consisted of stories presented as little-known or forgotten facts on a variety of subjects with some key element of the story (usually the name of some well-known person) held back until the end. The broadcasts always concluded with a variation on the tag line, "And now you know...the rest of the story." On the majority of radio stations, it often served as a mid-afternoon drive counterpart to Harvey's noontime News and Comment.

From its inception, the scripts for the series had been drafted and the broadcasts produced by Harvey's son Paul Harvey Jr., who in later years of his father's career also acted as a substitute host.  Some of the radio stories were published in book form as The Rest of the Story and More of The Rest of the Story.  (On the back cover of More of The Rest of the Story, the book is said to contain "True mysteries from history".) After the elder Harvey's death on February 28, 2009, ABC radio host Doug Limerick was chosen as the show's new host. The Rest of the Story was canceled after three weeks with Limerick as host.

References

General and cited references

External links 
 The Paul Harvey Unofficial Archives

2009 radio programme endings
American news radio programs